I Lost My Heart in Heidelberg is a 1952 West German romantic musical film directed by Ernst Neubach and starring Eva Probst, Adrian Hoven and Paul Hörbiger. The film takes its title from the popular song I Lost My Heart in Heidelberg, whose lyrics Neubach had co-written in the 1920s. It was part of a strong trend towards heimatfilm productions set in romanticised  Southern Germany, Austria or Switzerland. It premiered in Heidelberg on 29 October 1952.

Although they share the same title, the film is not a remake of I Lost My Heart in Heidelberg from 1926. It was made at the Spandau Studios in Berlin with location shooting at a variety of places included Cuxhaven, Wiesbaden and Heidelberg itself.

Cast
 Eva Probst as Hella Romberg
 Adrian Hoven as Tony de Boers
 Paul Hörbiger as Josef Degener
 Dorit Kreysler as Pia Biberger
 Herbert Hübner as Präsident de Boers
 Ruth Stephan as Dietlinde, Studentin
 Christiane Maybach as Rita, Studentin
 Joachim Teege as Heinrich, Konditor
 Wolfgang Neuss as Karl, Student
 Reinhard Kolldehoff as Kapitän Reimann
 Adi Lödel as Otto, Konditorlehrling
 Ingrid Merz as Schwester Elvira
 Maria Syna as Sekretärin
 Maria Hofen as Pensionswirtin
 Nora Hagist
 Anni Marle
 Edith Meinel

References

Bibliography

External links 
 

1952 films
1950s romantic musical films
German romantic musical films
West German films
Films set in Heidelberg
Gloria Film films
1950s German-language films
Films scored by Fred Raymond
German black-and-white films
Films shot at Spandau Studios
1950s German films